Sita Kumari Rai (born 3 January 1976) is a Nepalese Karate player. She is the first ever Nepalese women to win any sports related international medal. She won bronze in 1994 Asian games Karate (women's)+60 kg  Kumite.

References

1976 births
Living people
Nepalese female karateka
Asian Games medalists in karate
Karateka at the 1994 Asian Games
Medalists at the 1994 Asian Games
Asian Games bronze medalists for Nepal